Muslim Charity is an international relief and development non-governmental organization (NGO) that aims to alleviate the suffering of the world's poorest people. As well as responding to disasters and emergencies, it successfully carries out short and long-term development projects - regardless of race, religion or gender.

Muslim Charity is a registered charity in the United Kingdom, charity registration number 1078488. The charity was founded in 1999 by Shaykh Muhammad Imdad Hussain Pirzada and later in 2003 Junaid Jamshed joined the organisation. It was established with the key goal of alleviating poverty amongst Muslim communities around the world, with particular focus on Pakistan. The charity has provided emergency aid to thousands of individuals around the world. Muslim Charity has provided assistance following natural disasters such as the 2004 Indian Ocean earthquake and tsunami and the 2005 Pakistan earthquake. Amongst its worthy projects are housing schemes , safe water schemes , medical aid  etc.

After the tsunami, it provided support through its orphan sponsorship programme in connection with Indonesia Nahdalat al-Ulama. Following the Asian earthquake, Muslim Charity constructed a village for one hundred homeless people. This area has now officially been renamed as Al-Karam Village and it now comprises a school and a mosque provided by the charity and in February 2006, the Chairman of Muslim Charity, Shaykh Muhammad Imdad Hussain Pirzada himself visited Pakistan and Kashmir to see the work carried out by Muslim Charity and to officially inaugurate the Al-Karam Village.

Health, Education and Helping People that is what Muslim Charity is all about. Muslim Charity's vision is to create a world where people can appreciate life with good health and livelihood.

Work 
In 2009, Muslim Charity has developed the Safe Water Project. Which was decided to do in three phase. In August 2009, Muslim Charity has launched its Safe Water Campaign to raise $1 Million, and targeted to build 50 Deep Water Wells, 300 Water Hand Pumps, 25 Overhead Storage Tanks and 2 Water Reservoirs. By July 2010, Muslim Charity hopes to complete 70 Deep Water Wells, 600 Water Hand Pumps, 25 Overhead Water Storage Tanks and 2 Water Reservoirs.

Muslim Charity has also worked very hard in providing a long term solution to the people in need. Hence, it launched its gyne hospitals project. In July 2005, the first Gyne Hospital Jhang opened its doors  and has gained an excellent reputation which led to the establishment of a second hospital, Gyne Hospital Faisalabad, which opened its doors in May 2007.

External links
 https://mlfa.org/ - Muslim Legal Fund of America
 http://www.muslimcharity.org.uk - Muslim Charity Website

Islamic charities based in the United Kingdom
Water-related charities